Arshak Pavlovi Poladian (Armenian: Արշակ Փոլադյան )(born May 15, 1950) is an Armenian diplomat, historian, orientalist and author. Since 2019, Dr. Poladian is Armenian's ambassador to Tunisia and Morocco with residence in Yerevan. Previously Poladian was ambassador extraordinary and plenipotentiary of Armenia to Syria from 2007 to 2018 and Armenia's non-resident ambassador to the Hashemite Kingdom of Jordan from 2011 to 2018. Poladian also served as the Armenian ambassador to the United Arab Emirates from 2002 to 2006, and as the Armenian ambassador (non-resident) to the State of Kuwait and Kingdom of Bahrain from 2003 to 2007.

Poladian is a known expert of Oriental, Arabic and Kurdish studies. He published several important researches and monographs on the origin of Kurds based on the Arabic sources.

Early life and education
Poladian was born on May 15, 1950, in Ras al-Eyn in the Syrian province of Hassaka. He lived in Syria till 1963 then immigrated to Armenia with his family at the age of 13. He received his BA and MA in history in 1968-72 from Yerevan State Pedagogical Institute, Faculty of History and Geography. From 1978 till 1982 he was visiting scholar at Leningrad (Saint Petersburg) Institute of Oriental Studies, Soviet Union Academy of Sciences.

Diplomatic service 
Poladian started his diplomatic career in 1993. He served as head of the Arab Countries Division, Middle East Department at the Ministry of Foreign Affairs till 1998. In that capacity he was in charge of policy formulation and implementation of bilateral political, economic and cultural exchanges with the Arab countries. From 1998 till 2000 Poladian served as adviser to the Minister of Foreign Affairs on Middle Eastern affairs.

In 2000 he was appointed as Chargé d'Affaires of Armenia in United Arab Emirates, and in 2002 he was granted diplomatic rank of ambassador extraordinary and plenipotentiary and became Armenia's first ambassador to the United Arab Emirates till 2006. Simultaneously Poladian was appointed as non-resident ambassador to the State Kuwait and Kingdom of Bahrain from 2003 to 2007. On 26 April 2004 Poladian presented his credentials to Sheikh Hamad Bin Isa Al Khalifa, King of Bahrain. On 2 November 2004 he presented his credentials to the Emir of Kuwait as non-resident ambassador of Armenia.

On August 23, 2007, by the executive order of the president of Armenia, Poladian was appointed ambassador of Armenia to the Syrian Arab Republic. He presented his credentials to His Excellency President Dr. Bashar Al Assad on 7 October 2007, five days after his arrival, and since then his official tenure has started. Since 2011 Poladian also serves as non-resident ambassador to the Hashemite Kingdom of Jordan.  He presented his credentials to His Majesty King Abdullah II on April 2, 2011. On October 25, 2018, by the presidential executive order Poladian was recalled from Syria and Jordan. In recognition for his excellent diplomatic activities and noble personality, Poladian was awarded the Syrian Order of Merit of the Excellent Degree at a farewell ceremony organized by the Syrian Foreign and Expatriates Ministry on Thursday, November 15, 2018.

Academic career 
In addition to his diplomatic service, Poladian is a known expert on Oriental, Arabic and Kurdish studies. He published several important researched and monographs on the origin of Kurds based on the Arabic sources.

Poladian received his PhD in History from the National Academy of Sciences of Armenia in 1984. He also received a State Doctorate in Historical Sciences from the same Academy in 1996. He has worked at many scientific and educational centers from 1967 to 2000, and held various positions, most notably as Professor of Arabic studies at Yerevan State University; Scientific Researcher at the St. Petersburg branch of the Institute of Oriental Studies at the Russian Academy of Sciences; and Scientific Researcher at the Institute of Oriental Studies. Among Arshak's most important studies are, "Kurds in Arabic Sources," Yerevan (in Russian), 1987; "Kurds," Ankara (in Turkish), 1991; "Studies in the History and Culture of the East," Abu Dhabi, 2001; "History of Arab-Armenian Relations," Abu Dhabi, 2002; and "Islam: Religion & State," Abu Dhabi, 2003.

One of the most important work in this domain has been published by the ECSSR /“Emirates Center for Strategic Studies and Research”/ under the title: “The Origin of the Kurds in Arabic Sources” (Abu Dhabi, 2004, in Arabic, about 100 pages).

The book is based on a previous publication by the author on the same subject with slight additions and modifications (see "Kurds in Arabic Sources", Yerevan 1987, published in Russian by the Institute of Oriental Studies, Academy of Sciences of Soviet Armenia; translated into Arabic by Dr. Khatchadour Kasbarian and Abdul Karim Aba Zid, date and place of translation unknown). Parts of the above research could also be found in an earlier book of Poladian, published by the now closed “Zayed International Center for Coordination and Follow-up” (see “Studies in the History and Culture of the East", Abu Dhabi, 2001).

Examining the origin of the Kurds in accordance with Arabic sources addresses an important facet of Arab-Kurdish relations - it hasn't received sufficient attention from historians and hasn't been explored the way in which it ought to be. Investigating this issue is critical, especially in attempting to understand the contemporary Kurdish situation, current geopolitical developments, and the role of Kurds throughout the Middle and Near East.

The story of the Arabic origin of the Kurds in particular has, according to the study, emerged amidst the Arab milieu. There is much evidence that lends basis to the assumption that the Diar Rabia itself was the cradle of their nascency, later spreading to other parts of the Caliphate territories The Kurds' acceptance of the assertion that they derive from Arab origin should come as no surprise, in light of the consideration that the claim would have ensured Kurdish princes converting to Islam reverence and prestige in some circles and accordingly, the extension of their sphere of influence.

Other publications of Poladian, particularly relating to the Armenian-Arab relations, play a significant role in an enlightened quest for understanding and dialogue between Armenians and Arabs. Several important works in this domain were published In Damascus and Abu Dhabi under the titles “Armenia and the Arab world” Damascus, 2007; “Eyewitnesses on Armenian Genocide in the Ottoman Empire” (Arabic and Armenian), Damascus, 2015 and 2017; "History of Arab-Armenian Relations," Abu Dhabi, 2002. In his works Poladian touches not only the cultural relations and dialogue between the nations, but he discusses also the Arab role in helping the Armenians during the Genocide and documenting events, which is very much understudied. Little has been said of the role played by Arabs in addressing the humanitarian disaster that ensued as hundreds of thousands of refugees and orphans streamed out of Anatolia.

Main publications, books and monographs 
 "Kurds in 8-10 centuries in Arabic Sources," Yerevan (in Russian), 1987 (Book)
 "Kurds in Arabic Sources," Beirut (in Arabic), 1995 (Book) 
 “Covers of Arabic manuscripts in Armenia 8-14centuries”, author with A.Khachatryan
 “Kurdish dynasty of Marwanids and its relations with muslim emirates (2nd half of 10 century”, Yerevan, 1985
 “On history of spreading Islam among Kurds”, Moscow, 1982 (Article)
 “Kurdish Marwanids dynasty’s relations with Byzantine empire (10-11 centuries”, Yerevan, 1998 (Article)
 “The Islamization of the Kurds” Acta Kurdica, V.1, London, 1994
 “Kurdish tribes in 7-10 centuries in Arabic sources” Yerevan, 1984 (Article) 
 “The Yazidi religion (main deities and holly book ”, co-author with G.Asatryan, Yerevan, 1982 (Article) 
 “The medieval hypothesis on aArabic origin of Kurds” Yerevan, 1981 (Article)
 “The socio-ethnic meaning of “Kurd” in Arabic sources" Yerevan, 1983 (Article)
 “Social-economic situation of Kurds in Fars region”, Yerevan, 1982 (Article)
 “Reasons for the movements of Kurds in Arabic Khaliphate” Yerevan, 1985 (Article)
 “Construction activities of Marwanid emirs” Yerevan, 1986 (Article)
 “Kurdish military-political passages in Azerbaijan in the 1st half of 10th century” (Article)
 “Marwanid Kurds and Seljuks” Yerevan, 1996 (Article)
 "Kurds," Ankara (in Turkish), 1991
 "Studies in the History and Culture of the East," Abu Dhabi, 2001 
 "History of Arab-Armenian Relations," Abu Dhabi, 2002
 "Islam: Religion & State," Abu Dhabi, 2003
 “Armenia and the Arab world” Damascus, 2007
 “Eyewitnesses on Armenian Genocide in the Ottoman Empire” (Arabic), Damascus, 2014
 “Western eyewitnesses on Armenian Genocide in the Ottoman Empire” (Arabic), Damascus, 2016
 “Armenia yesterday and today” (Arabic), Damascus, 2016 
 “Eyewitnesses on Armenian Genocide in the Ottoman Empire” (Armenian), Yerevan, 2016 
 “Syrian arab eyewitness Fadhel al-Ghusein’s memoires on the Armenian Genocide” co-author with L.Sargsyan, (Armenian & Arabic), Damascus, 2017

Honors and awards 
 2006: UAE “Order of Independence” from the President of the United Arab Emirates Sheikh Khalifa bin Zayed Al Nahyan,
 2011: Gold Medal of the Ministry of Foreign Affairs of Armenia
 2013: The Medal of “Mkhitar Gosh” from the President of Armenia
2018: Order of Civil Merit (Excellent Class) of the Syrian Arab Republic
 awarded with medals and certificates from various Armenian and Syrian organizations

References

1950 births
Living people
Ambassadors of Armenia to Bahrain
Ambassadors of Armenia to Jordan
Ambassadors of Armenia to Kuwait
Ambassadors of Armenia to Syria
Ambassadors of Armenia to the United Arab Emirates
Armenian Arabists
Armenian orientalists
Kurdologists
Armenian diplomats
Syrian people of Armenian descent